Michael Mann is an American filmmaker known for his work in film and television. He has won a British Academy Film Award for his work on The Aviator and two Primetime Emmy Awards for his work in television.

Major awards

Academy Awards

British Academy Film Awards

Golden Globe Awards

Primetime Emmy Awards

Guild awards

Directors Guild of America Awards

Producers Guild of America Awards

Writers Guild of America Awards

Festival awards

Cannes Film Festival

Venice Film Festival

References 

Michael Mann